Selekan (also Romanized as Selekān; also known as Selehkān) is a village in Badr Rural District, in the Central District of Ravansar County, Kermanshah Province, Iran. At the 2006 census, its population was 119, in 27 families.

References 

Populated places in Ravansar County